GOQ may refer to:

 Gazette officielle du Québec, the official gazette of the Government of Quebec, Canada
 Genuine occupational qualification
 Golmud Airport, in Qinghai, China
 Gorap language
 Grand Officer of the National Order of Quebec